South Higgins Lake State Park is a public recreation area covering  on the southern shore of Higgins Lake five miles southwest of Roscommon in Roscommon County, Michigan. The state park occupies one mile of shoreline on Higgins Lake and entirely surrounds Marl Lake and portions of the Cut River.

Description
County Road 100 runs through the park, dividing it into north and south sections. The  Marl Lake section is less developed and has  of hiking trails. The park has a mixed pine, oak and maple forest. Bird species include nesting bald eagles, migratory loons, kingfisher and turkey.

History
Originally covering , the park opened in 1927 with a 15-unit campground that has since expanded to 400 units, making it the second largest camping area in the Michigan state park system. The park saw a major increase in size in 1984 when the state acquired the 700-acre portion of the park surrounding Marl Lake after development efforts by private interests failed.

Activities and amenities
The park offers swimming, boating, fishing, five miles of trails for hiking and cross-country skiing, hunting, picnicking and a 400-site campground.

References

External links

South Higgins Lake State Park Michigan Department of Natural Resources
South Higgins Lake State Park Map Michigan Department of Natural Resources

State parks of Michigan
Protected areas of Roscommon County, Michigan
Protected areas established in 1927